KGAS (1590 AM) is a terrestrial radio station, paired with an FM translator, broadcasting a sports format with local news, weather, and sports interspersed. Licensed to Carthage, Texas, United States, the station serves the state line area of far East Texas and western Louisiana.

Translators

History
The facility received a License to Cover on January 6, 1956, as a 1 kilowatt daytime only facility, from a transmission site on Old Carthage-Deadwood Road, 0.2 mile east of the Carthage city limits. The station was first proposed in 1955 by Thomas Alford and F.E. Barr, as the Carthage Broadcasting Company, with the studios located at 318 East Sabine St. Carthage, Texas, 75633. The facility is currently owned by Wanda J. Hanszen and Jerry T. Hanszen, through licensee Hanszen Broadcasting, Inc.

In 2014, an FM translator was acquired by Hanszen Broadcasting to operate at channel 279 (103.7 MHz). The translator was issued a License to Cover on September 8, 2014. K279CF operates with 250 watts ERP, from an elevation of 50 meters height above average terrain.

References

External links

FCC History Cards for KGAS

ESPN Radio stations
Panola County, Texas
Radio stations established in 1955
GAS
1955 establishments in Texas